Çağıl Özge Özkul (born September 27, 1988) is a Turkish TV Host, model and beauty pageant titleholder who was crowned Miss Universe Turkey 2012 and represented her country at the 2012 Miss Universe pageant.

Early life
Çağıl Özge Özkul studied economics at Ankara Atılım University.

Miss Turkey 2012 & Miss Universe 2012
Çağıl Özge Özkul won the Miss Universe Turkey 2012 title at the Lutfi Kirdar Convention and Exhibition Center on 31 May 2012. She represented Turkey in Miss Universe 2012 which was held in Las Vegas on December 19 where she broke a 20-year drought by placing in the Top 16.

She is a TV presenter and sports anchor for beIN SPORTS TR.

References

External links
Official Miss Turkey website
BeIN SPORTS TR

1988 births
Living people
Miss Universe 2012 contestants
Turkish beauty pageant winners